The following is a list of players that were named to the Associated Press All-Pro Team in 1967. Players from the first and second teams are listed, with players from the first team in bold, where applicable.

Teams

References
Pro-Football-Reference.com

All-Pro Teams
Allpro